José Montserrat Maceda (31 January 1917 – 5 May 2004) was a Filipino ethnomusicologist and composer. He was named a National Artist of the Philippines for Music in 1998.

Life 
Maceda was born in Manila, Philippines, he studied piano, composition and musical analysis at École Normale de Musique de Paris in France. After returning to the Philippines, he became a professional pianist, and later studied musicology at Columbia University, and anthropology at Northwestern University.

Starting in 1952, he conducted fieldwork on the ethnic Music of the Philippines. From about 1954, he was involved in the research and composition of musique concrète. In 1958, he worked at a recording studio in Paris which specialized in musique concrète. During this period, he met Pierre Boulez, Karlheinz Stockhausen and Iannis Xenakis. In 1963, Maceda earned a doctorate in ethnomusicology from the UCLA. He began pursuing a compositional career more vigorously. At the same time, he held concerts in Manila until 1969, in which he performed and conducted. This series of concerts introduced Boulez, Xenakis and Edgard Varèse to the Filipino public.

Music

As an ethnomusicologist, Maceda investigated various forms of music in Southeast Asia, producing numerous papers and even composing his own pieces for Southeast Asian instruments. His notable works include: Pagsamba for 116 instruments, 100 mixed and 25 male voices (1968); Cassette 100 for 100 cassette players (1971); Ugnayan for 20 radio stations (1974); Udlot-Udlot for several hundred to several thousand people (1975); Suling-Suling for 10 flutes, 10 bamboo buzzers and 10 flat gongs (1985). In 1977, Maceda aimed to study Philippine folk songs which he describes as having more focus on rhythm rather than time measure. From the 1990s, he also composed for Western orchestra and piano. The examples are: Distemperament for orchestra (1992); Colors without Rhythm for orchestra (1999); Sujeichon for 4 pianos (2002).

Jose Maceda collected audio records materials of traditional music amongst various populations in Philippines, Malaysia and Indonesia, part of these audio archives are deposited in the CNRS – Musée de l’Homme audio archives in France (a digitized version is available online). His entire musical collections were inscribed in the UNESCO Memory of the World Register in 2007, as submitted by the U.P. Center for Ethnomusicology and nominated by the Philippine government.

Death 
He died on May 5, 2004 at Quezon City, Philippines.

See also 
 Ramon Santos
 Lucrecia Kasilag

References

External links

 Jose Maceda audio archives Audio records collected by José Maceda in Philippines, Malaysia and Indonesia from 1955 to 1984, deposited in the CNRS – Musée de l’Homme audio archives held by the French Research Center For Ethnomusicologie.

1917 births
2004 deaths
20th-century classical composers
20th-century male musicians
20th-century musicologists
21st-century classical composers
21st-century male musicians
École Normale de Musique de Paris alumni
Ethnomusicologists
Columbia University alumni
Filipino classical composers
Male classical composers
Musicians from Manila
National Artists of the Philippines
Northwestern University alumni
Winners of the Nikkei Asia Prize